San Cayetano is a municipality and town in the Norte de Santander Department in Colombia. Part of its area pertains to the Metropolitan Area of Cúcuta.

References

External links 
 

Cúcuta
Municipalities of the Norte de Santander Department